Doap may refer to:

Dead or Alive Paradise
Doap Nixon
DOAP (Description of a Project, RDF Schema)